Bill Cox (born July 4, 1947) is an American speed skater. He competed in two events at the 1968 Winter Olympics.

References

1947 births
Living people
American male speed skaters
Olympic speed skaters of the United States
Speed skaters at the 1968 Winter Olympics
Speed skaters from Saint Paul, Minnesota